Privolny is a rural locality (a selo) in Yurkovsky Selsoviet, Tarumovsky District, Republic of Dagestan, Russia. The population was 451 as of 2010. There are 2 streets.

Geography 
Privolny is located 12 km east of Tarumovka (the district's administrative centre) by road. Tarumovka is the nearest rural locality.

References 

Rural localities in Tarumovsky District